Urmas Kibuspuu (5 December 1953 in Tallinn – 13 June 1985) was an Estonian actor.

In 1976 he graduated from Tallinn State Conservatory Stage Art Department. Since 1976 he worked at Estonian Drama Theatre, intermittently also in Estonia Theatre. Besides theatre roles he appeared in films and on television.

Kibuspuu died in 1985, aged thirty-one, of a brain tumor. He was buried at Tallinn's Forest Cemetery.

Filmography

 1976: Aeg elada, aeg armastada
 1980: Ideaalmaastik
 1982: Arabella, mereröövli tütar
 1984: Hundiseaduse aegu 
 1984: Karoliine hõbelõng 
 1984:	Naksitrallid I

References

1953 births
1985 deaths
Estonian male stage actors
Estonian male film actors
Estonian male television actors
20th-century Estonian male actors
Estonian Academy of Music and Theatre alumni
Male actors from Tallinn
Burials at Metsakalmistu